Goodwen was formed officially in March 2003. Originally created as a ska band, Goodwen's music later incorporated elements of hardcore punk, indie rock, and progressive rock.

The band, composed of seven members, has relentlessly toured the Midwest.
Goodwen currently has one full album, En Memoria Vestrum, with plans to release a second in the future. They also have two demo CDs available. The song "Question Marks" has also been featured in the compilation from Future Destionation Records, Reasons for Living.

Background 

Growing up in the household of the signed banjo artist Todd Elam, Tyler and Jordan Elam, (guitar and drums), along with long-time friend Dustin Smith began creating music as early as 2000.

Gradually as they began to expand their musical skills, more projects were developed involving more musicians using a variety of different instruments. Cody Madonna, a longtime friend of Jordan, suggested the idea of beginning a Ska band. With this development came the addition of Armond Luckey and his amazing trumpet ability, Dustin Schamaun with a deep appreciation for the underlying tones of jazz saxophone, and Julie Heidorn on trombone.

GOODWEN - Is a six member group from Middletown, Ohio that plays "progressive horn rock". The musical style is broad-based due to the diverse tastes of the group. The sound can move from heavy to soft. There are those who mistake Goodwen for a Ska band because they have a trumpet and sax. Most assuredly, they are not.~FaithFest.net."

Goodwen has stated in their Cincy CDs interview that, though the band has horns and was originally thought to be a ska band, Goodwen does not consider themselves to be a ska band, nor do they wish to be thought of as a ska band.

Members 

Current:
 Dustin Smith-vocals
 Tyler Elam-Guitar/backing vocals
 Jordan Elam-drums/backing vocals
 Armond Luckey-Trumpet
 Dustin Schamaun-Tenor Saxophone
 Cody Madonna-Bass guitar
Past
 Julie Heidorn-Trombone (2003–2005)

Touring 

Over the years, Goodwen has shared stages with many bands such as: Blindside, The Elms, Ace Troubleshooter, Roper, Dead Poetic, Cartel, Showbread and others. Touring from Wisconsin to West Virginia, the band has performed over two hundred shows.

Often the band toured with their long-time friends The Red Racer, a prominently Indie rock band from Terre Haute, Indiana.

Goodwen has also made several performances at Ichthus Christian rock festival with attendance in the tens of thousands.

Discography

2003 Demo 
 More Than Sunday
 The You I used to Know
 It Doesn't Change
 A Better Way

Paper Bag Demo 
 Rust to None
 One Nation
 The Truth We Know Nothing Of

En Memoria Vestrum 
 The End of the End is Only the Beginning
 "Question Marks"
 The Long Road I Hope to Take Again
 In Order to Prevent Further Confusion
 A Light in our Darkest Hour
 A Glance at the Present From the Past

Reasons for Living 
Future Destinations Compilation
 -Question Marks (19)

Reasons for Living

Videography 
DVD
 Our Band Can Beat Up Your Band, We Talked About It The Whole Way Home

Online Video Sample
 Goodwen Video 1

Controversy-a New Reality 
In late 2005 Goodwen was contacted by an anonymous solo performer dubbed A New Reality, who claimed that Goodwen had stolen his music without consent. The performer has no formal proof other than a recording of the song "A Glance at the Present from the Past" performed differently. There have since been no further accusations.

Future 
In early 2006, Cody Madonna declared that he would be taking a year-long certification course in Orlando, Florida to become a licensed Harley Davidson mechanic. Unable to perform without a bass guitar player, Goodwen decided to take a break. Though the official final show of Goodwen was March 3, 2006 at 4th and Main in Franklin, Ohio, the band has since performed one reunion show at The Garage in Springboro Ohio From the message boards, with the return of Cody scheduled for the summer of 2007, Goodwen has plans to write and record new material. Members have also claimed that they expect a new album release mid to late summer of 2007, which will contain several songs already written in the Goodwen Archives as well as songs currently being written.

Distributors 
 Cincy Cds-Promoters: En Memoria Vestrum
 Future Destinations Records- Producers: Reason for Living

Media/News/Interviews 
Rocking at the Alter
Cincy CD's Interview
Cox News Goodwen Article
Goodwen News Video Footage (QuickTime)
Concert Listing

References

External links 
 Goodwen Official Site
 Goodwen on Pure Volume

Indie rock musical groups from Ohio
Musical groups established in 2003